The International Safety Equipment Association (ISEA) is a trade association of manufacturers of personal protective equipment and other safety equipment, with its offices in Arlington, Virginia.  More than 100 companies are members. The ISEA is the secretariat organization for several American National Standards Institute technical standards for products such as high visibility clothing, eye protection, hard hats, chemical and dust protection, hand protection, and others; formerly this role was filled by the American Society of Safety Engineers.

The organization was founded in 1933 as the Industrial Safety Equipment Association. It adopted its current name in 2000. Since 2002 it has had a Web site accessible to the public and member organizations. In addition to technical standards development and market research, the organization also provides representation of the safety products industry to the American government.

References

External links
  Official website

Trade associations based in the United States
Organizations based in Arlington County, Virginia
Safety organizations